These Daughters of Mine is a 2015 Polish comedy film directed by Kinga Dębska. The film was screened at Gdynia Film Festival in 2015 where it won both Audience and Journalist Awards. The same year, the film also became a recipient of Audience Award at the Ann Arbor Film Festival, and in 2016, was awarded with an Eagle Award from Polish Film Awards.

Plot
Marta, star of popular series, is 42 years old, she is strong and dominant. Despite fame and money, he still can't shape her life. Emotionally unstable 40-year-old Kasia is stuck in a far-fetched marriage, raising a teenage son. The sisters are not very fond of each other, they completely do not understand and do not even try to understand their life choices. Illness and, consequently, the loss of one parent force them to act together. Women gradually approach each other, regain lost contact, which provokes several tragicomic situations.

Cast
Agata Kulesza as Marta
Gabriela Muskała as Kasia
Marcin Dorociński as Grzegorz
Marian Dziędziel as Father
 Małgorzata Niemirska as Mother
Łukasz Simlat as Piotr
Barbara Kurzaj as Iza
Jeremi Protas as Filip
Maria Dębska as Zuzia

References

External links

2015 comedy films
Polish comedy films